From Beirut to Jerusalem (1989) is a book by American journalist Thomas L. Friedman chronicling his days as a reporter in Beirut during the Lebanese Civil War and in Jerusalem through the first year of the Intifada. 

Friedman wrote a 17-page epilogue for the first paperback edition (Anchor Books, 1990) concerning the potential for peaceful resolution in Israel and Palestine.

Reception

It received the 1989 National Book Award for Nonfiction and also the Cornelius Ryan Award. In a book review for The Village Voice, Edward Said criticized what he saw as a naive, arrogant, and orientalist account of the Israel–Palestine conflict.

References

External links
Booknotes interview with Friedman on From Beirut to Jerusalem, September 10, 1989

Books about Lebanon
Lebanese Civil War
Israeli–Palestinian conflict books
National Book Award for Nonfiction winning works
1989 non-fiction books